Costa Rica competed at the 2019 World Aquatics Championships in Gwangju, South Korea from 12 to 28 July.

Artistic swimming

Costa Rica's artistic swimming team consisted of 10 athletes (10 female).

Women

 Legend: (R) = Reserve Athlete

Open water swimming

Costa Rica qualified one male and one female open water swimmers.

Men

Women

Swimming

Costa Rica entered three swimmers.

Men

Women

References

World Aquatics Championships
2019
Nations at the 2019 World Aquatics Championships